"Comment te dire adieu" (English: "How to Say Goodbye to You") is a French adaptation of the song "It Hurts to Say Goodbye". It was originally recorded by Françoise Hardy in 1968.

"It Hurts to Say Goodbye" was written by Arnold Goland, probably best known for his co-operation with Phil Spector, and the American producer and songwriter Jacob "Jack" Gold (1921-1992). In 1966 it was recorded by Margaret Whiting on her album The Wheel of Hurt. In 1967 a release by Vera Lynn reached No. 7 on Billboards Adult Contemporary chart.

These versions were interpreted in the style of a ballad, as was the first French version of the song with lyrics by Michèle Vendôme titled "Avant de dire adieu" which was released by Ginette Reno on her 1967 album Quelqu'un à aimer. More beat driven were the instrumental interpretations by Brazil's Walter Wanderley, dominated by the Hammond organ he is known for, and the Frenchman Caravelli, who focused more on strings, both published in the same year. The Jack Gold Orchestra & Chorus version, which was in a style similar to the Caravelli release, made No. 28 on the Billboard Easy Listening charts in 1969.

Françoise Hardy heard an "American instrumental version" of the song and her manager asked Serge Gainsbourg to provide suitable lyrics for it. The resultant "Comment te dire adieu" was combined with an arrangement relatively closer to the Caravelli version and included on Hardy's 1968 album. Hardy also recorded the song in Italian ("Il pretesto", 1968) and German ("Was mach' ich ohne dich", 1970; collected in the album Träume, 1970.) The French lyrics are notable for their uncommon rhymes in "ex", within the subject of the song having a sense of "ex" as in "ex-boyfriend".

A German version with new lyrics, titled "Ich sage dir adieu", was released by veteran Greek-German singer Vicky Leandros on her 2010 album Zeitlos.

Formats and track listings

French SP 
Production Asparagus/Disques Vogue/Vogue international industries (V.45-1552), 1968.
A-side: "Comment te dire adieu" ("It Hurts to Say Goodbye"), (ad. lyrics from Jack Gold: Serge Gainsbourg / music: Arnold Goland, arr. S. Gainsbourg) – 2:25
B-side: "L'Anamour" (lyrics and music: Serge Gainsbourg) – 2:14

English SP 
Asparagus Production/United Artists (UP 35011 ), 1969.
A-side: "Comment te dire adieu" ("It Hurts to Say Goodbye"), (ad. lyrics from Jack Gold: Serge Gainsbourg / music: Arnold Goland, arr. S. Gainsbourg) – 2:25
B-side: "La Mer, les étoiles et le vent" (lyrics and music: Françoise Hardy) – 1:50

French EP 
Production Asparagus/disques Vogue/Vogue international industries (EPL 8652), 1968.
A1: "Comment te dire adieu" ("It Hurts to Say Goodbye"), (ad. lyrics from Jack Gold: Serge Gainsbourg / music: Arnold Goland, arr. S. Gainsbourg) – 2:25
A2: "Il vaut mieux une petite maison dans la main, qu'un grand château dans les nuages" (lyrics: Jean-Max Rivière / music: Gérard Bourgeois) – 2:23		
B1: "Suzanne", (ad. lyrics from Leonard Cohen: Graeme Allwright / music: L. Cohen) – 3:08 
B2: "La Mer, les étoiles et le vent" (lyrics and music: Françoise Hardy) – 1:50

Jimmy Somerville version

The song was covered in 1989 by former Bronski Beat and Communards singer Jimmy Somerville, as a duet with June Miles-Kingston. It was a hit in the UK, reaching number 14 on the UK Singles Chart, helping Somerville's solo career take off. David Giles of Music Week deemed Somerville's cover as "a slightly housey version", adding: "The sheer vivacity of his performance sends the record soaring off the turntable, and the orchestral bits topped with spoken French are out of this universe".

Track listing
 7" single
 "Comment te dire adieu" (7" version) — 3:35
 "Tell the World" — 4:12

Charts and certifications

Weekly charts

Year-end charts

Certifications

Kate Ryan version 

In 2016, Belgian dance singer Kate Ryan covered the song and released it as a stand-alone single via iTunes on 24 June 2016, under CNR Music Belgium. It was produced by Yves Jongen a.k.a. Yves Gaillard and Soufiane Amrani "Amro".

A music video accompanied the song, premiered via YouTube on 29 June 2016.

Other cover versions
 1967: Walter Wanderley, a Brazilian organist, recorded an instrumental cover of the song on his album Batucada
 1967: Caravelli and his orchestra released an instrumental version on the album Eloïse
 1969: Anni-Frid Lyngstad, later a member of ABBA, recorded the song in Swedish as Så synd du måste gå ("So sad you have to go"); it was also included on her 1972 album Anni-Frid Lyngstad
 1973: Czech recording by Hana Hegerová titled Rýmováni o životě ("Rhyming about life")
 1974: Russian version Моя мечта ("My dream") by Aida Vedishcheva
 1985: Jun Togawa recorded a Japanese version, さよならをおしえて (Sayonara wo oshiete, literally "Tell me goodbye")
 1987: Taxi Girl's frontman Daniel Darc, collected on Sous influence divine
 1996: Jane Birkin published an "arabesque version" on her album Versions Jane
 1996: Brave Combo recorded the song as "A Way to Say Goodbye" on their album Kiss of Fire, with a new English lyric by guest vocalist Lauren Agnelli.
 1999: A new Czech version by Ilona Csáková titled Jedno Tajemství ("A Secret")  featured on the album Blízká i vzdálená
 2001: A cover arranged by Tomosuke Funaki, and sung by Shizue Tokui (as Orange Lounge), appeared in beatmania IIDX 6th style
 2003:  French cover by Annie and Valérie, two contestants of Star Academy 3 and included on the album Star Academy fait sa bamba
 2008: Instrumental guitar band from Finland, Agents arranged the song for their instrumental album Agents... Is Beat!
 2009: Amanda Lear recorded her version for her album Brief Encounters.
 2010: Cover by Satanicpornocultshop in their album Arkhaiomelisidonophunikheratos
 2011: A cover of the French version with the lyrics sung by Berry was released by Germany's Blank & Jones on their album Relax Edition Six
 2012: Meg, a Japanese singer, covered the song in French for her album La Japonaise
 2012: English cover by Julian Ovenden
 2012: French/Italian cover by LaCalani
 2020: Covered by Pomplamoose
 2021: Cover by Reni Jusis featured on her album Je suis Reni

Usage in film and television 
 2018: A Simple Favor
 2014: Falling Star ("Stella cadente" / Spain) / "Comment te dire adieu"
 2013: Coming out (Hungary) / "It hurts to say goodbye" (Saxophone version)
 2009: The Island Inside  ("La isla interior" / Spain) / "Comment te dir adieu"
 2004: Ferpect Crime  ("Crimen ferpecto" / Spain/Italy) / "Comment te dire adieu"
 1987: Mournful Unconcern ("Скорбное бесчувствие" / Soviet Union)
 1972: A Revolta dos Anjos ("Revolt of the Angels / TV Series/Brazil) / "Comment te dire adieu"

References

External links
 Françoise Hardy, "Comment te dire adieu", Lyrics on German fan site, (per 12 November 2017)
 Jack Gold Discography, Writing-Arrangement Credits, Discogs, (per 12 November 2017)
 Cover versions of It Hurts to Say Goodbye by Margaret Whiting, SecondHandSongs, (per 12 November 2017)
 Arnold Goland, IMDb, (per 12 November 2017)

Songs about parting
1966 songs
1968 singles
Françoise Hardy songs
Vera Lynn songs
1989 debut singles
Jimmy Somerville songs
Songs written by Serge Gainsbourg
Disques Vogue singles
London Records singles
Male–female vocal duets